In email technology, IDLE is an IMAP feature described in RFC 2177 that allows a client to indicate to the server that it is ready to accept real-time notifications.

Significance
The IDLE feature allows IMAP email users to immediately receive any mailbox changes without having to undertake any action such as clicking on a refresh button, or having the email client automatically and repeatedly ask the server for new messages.

Usage
IMAP4 servers that support IDLE will include the string "IDLE" in the result of their CAPABILITY command. This allows email users to receive near instant notification of a new email.

See also 
Push-IMAP

Notes

External links 
 RFC 2177: IMAP4 IDLE

Internet mail protocols